William Mark Greig (born January 25, 1970) is a Canadian former professional ice hockey right winger who played nine seasons in the National Hockey League (NHL) for the Hartford Whalers, Toronto Maple Leafs, Calgary Flames and Philadelphia Flyers. He is currently a scout with the Flyers. He is the younger brother of former NHL player Bruce Greig.

Playing career
Greig was drafted 15th overall by the Whalers in the 1990 NHL Entry Draft and scored 13 goals and 27 assists for 40 points in 125 games during his NHL career.

Awards
WHL East First All-Star Team (1990)
AHL First All-Star Team (2001)

Personal life
Greig and his wife Cindy have three children, two daughters Kyra and Dara and one son Ridly, a centre, who was selected in the first round by the Ottawa Senators in the 2020 NHL Entry Draft. His daughter Dara joined the University of Wisconsin Badgers women's ice hockey program in the autumn of 2019.

Career statistics

Regular season and playoffs

References

External links
 

1970 births
Atlanta Knights players
Calgary Flames players
Calgary Wranglers (WHL) players
Canadian ice hockey right wingers
Grand Rapids Griffins (IHL) players
Hamburg Freezers players
Hartford Whalers draft picks
Hartford Whalers players
Houston Aeros (1994–2013) players
Ice hockey people from Alberta
Iserlohn Roosters players
Kassel Huskies players
Lethbridge Hurricanes players
Living people
National Hockey League first-round draft picks
Philadelphia Flyers players
Philadelphia Flyers scouts
Philadelphia Phantoms players
Quebec Rafales players
Saint John Flames players
St. John's Maple Leafs players
Springfield Falcons players
Toronto Maple Leafs players
Canadian expatriate ice hockey players in Germany
People from High River